The Antrim Iron Company was an iron works that operated in Mancelona, Michigan from 1886 to 1945. The site of the iron works was south of Mancelona, between U.S. Route 131 and the railroad tracks.

History
In 1882, an organization by the name of "John Otis & Company" built a large charcoal furnace on the site. The company also platted a town around the furnace, naming it "Furnaceville". Soon after this, the Grand Rapids and Indiana Railroad built a station at the town. The furnace flourished, and in 1886 a group of businessmen from Grand Rapids bought out the company, and renamed the company Antrim Iron Works and the town Antrim. A large blast furnace and iron works was built on the site, and the new company began doing business.

Methods of manufacturing and transportation
In the beginning of the corporation, timber was hauled in from various lumber camps around Northern Michigan to be harvested for iron products at the plant. After many years of buying material to create the iron with, the company decided to obtain its own timber, and built a small railroad branch (named the Mancelona North West Railroad) heading 2 miles west from the company site. With this spur line, the company logged its own lumber and hauled it in on its own railroad, proving to be quite self-sufficient. This lasted until the 1920s, when the lumber ran out and other ways were developed to obtain the iron.

The war
During World War II the company became extremely busy. With the vast need for materials for the war effort, the factory was working around the clock trying to produce enough products for the orders they were getting. This held true throughout most of the war.

Closing, demise, and current status
After the war ended, the company quickly slowed down, and closed in 1945. The factory stood abandoned for over forty years, until it was torn down in the mid-1980s. Today all that is left of the old furnace consists of a few foundations, a small outbuilding, and a former railroad siding. The company dumped its waste in a pond behind the building, which years later led to water contamination in the town. The pond, called "Tar Lake", was cleaned up in the mid to late 1990s.

References

Industrial buildings and structures in Michigan
Ironworks and steel mills in the United States